York College is a public senior college in Jamaica, Queens, New York City.  It is a senior college in the City University of New York (CUNY) system. Founded in 1966, York was the first senior college founded under the newly formed CUNY system, which united several previously independent public colleges into a single public university system in 1961. The college is a member-school of Thurgood Marshall College Fund. The college enrolls more than 8,000 students.

Academics

The college is organized into three schools: the School of Arts & Sciences, the School of Business & Information Systems, and the School of Health Sciences and Professional Programs. Through those schools, York College offers B.A. and B.S. degrees in over 44 different programs.

In addition to the CUNY Aviation Institute, York College is home to the Northeast Regional Office and Laboratory of the U.S. Food and Drug Administration (FDA). The college's approximately 30,000 alumni serve in practically every professional endeavor, including medicine, research, law, business and social work. Approximately 40 percent of York's students study part-time, and in fall 2008 almost 700 new students were transfer students and over 1,000 were first-time freshmen.

Governance
Faculty, students, and administrative staff participate in college governance, which is conducted according to procedures outlined in the bylaws of CUNY and in the York College Charter as approved by the Board of Trustees of CUNY. The York College Senate is the chief legislative body of the college. Reporting to the Senate are various standing college committees, which oversee such matters as curriculum and academic standards.

Accreditation
York is accredited by the Middle States Commission on Higher Education and is a member of the Association of Colleges and Universities of the State of New York, the American Association of Colleges for Teacher Education, and the Council for the Accreditation of Educator Preparation, (CAEP). All education programs are registered by the New York State Department of Education and lead to New York State provisional certification after passing the written parts of the New York State Teacher Certification Examination after students pass the examination. York's Occupational Therapy Program is accredited by the Accreditation Council for Occupational Therapy Education (ACOTE) of the American Occupational Therapy Association (AOTA); The Physician Assistant Studies Program is accredited by the Accreditation Review Commission on Education for the Physician Assistant, Inc.; York's Social Work program is accredited by the Council on Social Work Education; and the Nursing Program by the National League for Nursing. A degree in accounting at York College includes all the educational requirements to sit for the Uniform Certified Public Accounting.

Graduation rate
Since 1971, York College has conferred 30,000 undergraduate and graduate degrees. York students progress toward graduation at different rates. Most students combine the role of student with that of employee and/or parent which may necessitate part-time enrollment or temporary leaves from their academic pursuits. In 2021, U.S. News & World Report reported an average 6-year graduation rate of 31%.

Location and facilities
At the heart of the 50-acre York College campus is the Academic Core Building, which houses classrooms, lecture halls, laboratories, art studios, the library, computer facilities, academic and administrative offices, as well as dining facilities and a bookstore. On adjacent super blocks are located the 1,500 seat Performing Arts Center, the Health and Physical Education facility, which includes a gymnasium and swimming pool, Classroom and Science Buildings, Athletic Fields and parking facilities. The Performing Arts Center was renamed the Milton G. Bassin Performing Arts Center in October 2014 after the York College's second president. Milton G. Bassin, who guided the school during the period from 1971 to 1991 and was instrumental in ensuring the school's survival through the fiscal crisis of the 1970s. Also located on the campus is the Illinois Jacquet Performance Space, dedicated for the famous jazz saxophonist who lived in Addesleigh Park, a jazz enclave in Jamaica. It is on the grounds of the adjacent Prospect Cemetery in the Chapel of the Sisters, the cemetery is on the NRHP.

York College Student Activities strives to complement the academic experience with co- and extra-curricular programs that promote social and personal development. York College staff advises and assists student groups in planning social, educational, and recreational programs, and provides opportunities for the development of leadership skills. Academic, social, athletic, cultural, recreational, political, and special interest groups add additional sets of valuable learning experiences for both students and faculty.

Student Activities works closely with the Student Government Association (SGA). SGA is composed of students elected by their peers to represent and advocate for all students.

Institutes
The CUNY Aviation Institute (AI) at York College was established in 2003 by a grant from the Port Authority of New York and New Jersey to promote high quality education and research for the aviation industry. The AI is headquartered in New York City and is located on the campus of York College.

In cooperation with local, national, and international partners the CUNY Aviation Institute develops teaching materials regarding airlines, airports, service providers, civil aviation authorities, and related industries. Furthermore, the CUNY Aviation Institute develops programs of study at all academic levels, including credit and non-credit courses.

The CUNY Aviation Institute also promotes research and academic exchange of ideas in the field of aviation and assists in the training of professional educators and researchers.  CUNY Aviation Institute has a partnership network comprising the private sector, educational institutions, international organizations, trade associations, governments and other bodies with interest in aviation management.

Athletics 
York competes as an NCAA Division III member of the City University of New York Athletic Conference.

Notable people

Faculty
 James Como was Professor of Speech and Rhetoric from 1968 to 2013
 Daisy Cocco De Filippis was Professor of Spanish, 1983–2002
 Ron Daniels Distinguished Lecturer in Political Science, Department of Behavioral Sciences, 2007–2018
 Nancy Foner was Assistant Professor of Anthropology, 1970–1973
 Bruce Jay Friedman was Visiting Professor of English, 1974–1976
 David Ignatow was Professor of English and Poet-in-Residence, 1968–1984
 Reatha King was Professor of Chemistry, 1968–1977, as well as serving as Associate Dean of the Division of Natural Sciences & Mathematics, and later Associate Dean of Academic Affairs
 Eileen Southern was Professor of Music, 1968–1974

Alumni
Sal F. Albanese (1972), New York City politician and businessperson
Carole Berotte Joseph (1971), first Haitian-born United States college president
Maryanne J. George (2015), American Christian musician
Deborah Persaud, (1981), virologist
Gerald A. Reynolds (1989), Chair of the U.S. Commission on Civil Rights from 2004 to 2010
James Siegel (1977), author and political advisor

References

External links 

 Official website
 Official athletics website

 
Colleges of the City University of New York
Public universities and colleges in New York (state)
Universities and colleges in New York City
Educational institutions established in 1966
Universities and colleges in Queens, New York
Jamaica, Queens
1966 establishments in New York City
Universities and colleges on Long Island